Kim Hyo-sim (born 29 March 1994) is a North Korean weightlifter and Asian Games Champion competing in the 63 kg category until 2018 and 64 kg starting in 2018 after the International Weightlifting Federation reorganized the categories.

Career
She competed at the 2018 Asian Games placing first in every lift, and winning a gold medal in the 63 kg category.

References

External links

Living people
1994 births
North Korean female weightlifters
Asian Games medalists in weightlifting
Weightlifters at the 2018 Asian Games
Medalists at the 2018 Asian Games
Asian Games gold medalists for North Korea
World Weightlifting Championships medalists
20th-century North Korean women
21st-century North Korean women